A blighted ovum is a pregnancy in which the embryo never develops or develops and is reabsorbed. In a normal pregnancy, an embryo would be visible on an ultrasound by six weeks after the woman's last menstrual period. Anembryonic gestation is one of the causes of miscarriage of a pregnancy.

A blighted ovum or anembryonic gestation is characterized by a normal-appearing gestational sac, but the absence of an embryo.  It likely occurs as a result of early embryonic death with continued development of the trophoblast.  When small, the sac cannot be distinguished from the early normal pregnancy, as there may be a yolk sac, though a fetal pole is not seen.  For diagnosis, the sac must be of sufficient size that the absence of normal embryonic elements is established.  The criteria depends on the type of ultrasound exam performed.  A pregnancy is anembryonic if a transvaginal ultrasound reveals a sac with a mean gestational sac diameter (MGD) greater than 25 mm and no yolk sac, or an MGD >25 mm with no embryo.  Transabdominal imaging without transvaginal scanning may be sufficient for diagnosing early pregnancy failure when
an embryo whose crown–rump length is 15 mm or more has no visible cardiac activity.

See also
Ovum
Products of conception

References

External links 

 Blighted Ovum on WebMD
 Anembryonic pregnancy on Radiopaedia.org
 

Health issues in pregnancy
Pregnancy with abortive outcome